Emirhan Kaşcıoğlu (born 1 January 2001) is a Turkish professional footballer who plays as a defender for Denizlispor.

Professional career
Kaşcıoğlu is a youth product of Denizlispor since 2014, and signed his first professional contract on 3 October 2020.<He made his professional debut with Denizlispor in a 1–0 Süper Lig loss to Hatayspor on 8 May 2020.

References

External links
 
 

2001 births
Living people
People from Erzurum Province
Turkish footballers
Association football defenders
Denizlispor footballers
Süper Lig players
TFF First League players
TFF Third League players